Chapter III is the third & most recent studio album by American R&B/pop music group 3T. It was released on November 6, 2015, by Warrior Records.

The entire album was written and produced solely by the trio and is their first release since Identity (2004).

Track listing

References

2015 albums